Roland Thomas "Sonny" Jackson (born July 9, 1944) is an American former baseball shortstop and outfielder for the Houston Colt .45's / Astros (1963–67) and Atlanta Braves (1968–74).

 Jackson led the National League in singles (160) and sacrifice hits (27) in 1966.  He helped the Braves win the NL Western Division in 1969.

In 12 seasons he played in 936 games and had 3,055 at bats, 396 runs, 767 hits, 81 doubles, 28 triples, 7 home runs, 162 RBI, 126 stolen bases, 250 walks, .251 batting average, .308 on-base percentage, .303 slugging percentage, 925 total bases, 57 sacrifice hits, 17 sacrifice flies and 11 intentional walks.

Jackson's best year at the plate came in his "rookie" season of 1966. Although he had played in the "Big Leagues" for parts of seasons before, Jackson qualified as a "rookie" in 1966.  He had a .292 batting average and three home runs in 596 trips to the plate.  The same year he stole 49 bases, which tied the then-MLB rookie single-season record set by Rollie Zeider in 1910.

After his playing days, Jackson continued to be active in baseball.  He was a coach and manager for several minor league teams in the Atlanta Braves and San Francisco Giants organization and a coach with the Giants major league team.

See also
 Houston Astros award winners and league leaders

Notes

References

External links

1944 births
Living people
Houston Colt .45s players
Houston Astros players
Atlanta Braves players
Major League Baseball shortstops
Major League Baseball center fielders
San Francisco Giants coaches
Atlanta Braves coaches
Major League Baseball third base coaches
Hawaii Islanders players
Iowa Oaks players
Richmond Braves players
Oklahoma City 89ers players
Modesto Colts players
San Antonio Bullets players
Baseball players from Washington, D.C.